This is a list of cricketers who have played first-class, List A or Twenty20 matches for Hyderabad cricket team in Pakistan. The team played 184 first-class matches between 1958 and 2015, 30 List A matches between 1985 and 2016, and 5 Twenty20 matches in 2015.

Players

 Mohammad Afzal
 Qamar Ahmed
 Rizwan Ahmed
 Zahid Ahmed
 Abid Ali
 Masroor Ali
 Mir Ali
 Nauman Ali
 Faisal Athar
 Mohammad Awais
 Nasir Awais
 Farhan Ayub
 Tariq Aziz
 Kashif Bhatti
 Imran Brohi
 Azeem Ghumman
 Mohammad Hasnain
 Khadim Hussain
 Sajjad Hussain
 Mohammad Hasnain
 Aamer Iqbal
 Shahid Iqbal
 Bilal Irshad
 Sohail Jaffar
 Alan Jones
 Babar Khan
 Haris Khan
 Imran Khan
 Razaullah Khan
 Sharjeel Khan
 Lal Kumar
 Zahid Mahmood
 Nasrullah Memon
 Imraan Mohammad
 Ghulam Murtaza
 Naumanullah
 Mohammad Nawaz
 Shahid Qambrani
 Umar Rasheed
 Kashif Raza
 Abdur Rehman
 Hanif-ur-Rehman
 Naeem-ur-Rehman
 Aslam Sattar
 Hazrat Shah
 Iqbal Sheikh (born 1934)
 Iqbal Sheikh (born 1973)
 Iqbal Sikander
 Mohammad Sohail
 Taj Wasan
 Pir Zulfiqar

References

Hyderabad cricketers